Dafni (Δαφνί) or Dafnio (Δαφνίο) is a small town of Laconia in the municipality of Evrotas, and to the Krokees municipality before the 2011 Kallikratis reform. In the 2011 census its population was registered as 865.

History 

The current residents of the village originate from the nearby village of Lykovouno, a medieval settlement. The name Dafni may originate in turn from the ancient settlement of Aphidnae, or otherwise simply from the prevalence of laurels in the area (δάφνη is the Greek word for laurel). The village is notable for its agricultural produce, as well as the annual "Vlach Wedding" (Βλάχικος Γάμος) and wine festival.

Associations in Dafni 

 Cultural Association of Dafni (Πολιτιστικός Σύλλογος Δαφνίου), established in 1929 and has:

- Chess Group

- Music Group

- Dance Group

- Youth Group

 Athletic Association of Dafni ( Αθλητικός Όμιλος Δαφνίου) established in 1959 and has:

- Football Team of men

- Youth Football Team

 Athletic Association "Olympiada Dafniou" ( Αθλητικός Σύλλογος "Ολυμπιάδα Δαφνίου") has:

- Men Basketball Team

Notable people
 Ilias Anastasakos, Greek football player
 Angelo Tsarouchas, Greek-Canadian actor

External links
Dafnio

References

Populated places in Laconia